Medjumbe Island is one of the Quirimbas Islands off the northern coast of Mozambique, within the Quirimbas National Park. It is privately owned, operated as an exclusive resort.
Accommodations are 13 thatched wooden chalets.
It is surrounded by spectacular coral reefs.
Tourist activities include diving and snorkeling, windsurfing and deep sea fishing.

References

Private islands of Africa
Quirimbas Islands
Resorts in Mozambique